Located in Lucknow, the Vidhan Bhavan is the seat of the bicameral legislature of the Indian state of Uttar Pradesh. The lower house is the Vidhan Sabha (Legislative Assembly) and the upper house is called the Vidhan Parishad or the (Legislative Council). The Vidhan Sabha had 431 members until 1967, but now comprises 403 directly elected members and one nominated member from the Anglo-Indian community. The Vidhan Parishad has 100 members.

Built in 1928, the building was originally called the "Council House". It has been home to the legislature since 1937, along with housing other important offices of government.

History
In early 20th century, the capital of what is now the state of Uttar Pradesh was Allahabad; a decision was taken in 1922 to move the capital to Lucknow and to construct a building there to house the Assembly Constituency. On 15 December 1922, then Governor of Uttar Pradesh, Spencer Harcourt Butler, laid the foundation of the Vidhan Bhavan. The building was designed by Samuel Swinton Jacob and Heera Singh; Singh also drew up the blueprint of the building. Butler subsequently monitored the construction of the building.

Building
Construction of Vidhan Bhavan started 15 December 1922 and took little over five years to complete. The building is made of carved light brown sandstone from Mirzapur. Many of the inside halls, galleries and verandas are built of marble from Agra and Jaipur. Circular marble staircases run on both sides of the entrance hall and the walls of the staircases are embellished with paintings. The main chamber of the building is octagonal in shape with a domed roof. A separate chamber for the upper house was constructed between 1935 and 1937. The buildings of both houses are connected by veranda with offices on both sides.

Composition 
Articles 168 to 212 in Part VI of the constitution of India deal with the organisation, composition, duration, officers, procedures, privileges, powers and so on of the state legislature. The Uttar Pradesh Legislature (Vidhan Bhavan) consists of two houses called the Vidhan Sabha and the Vidhan Parishad with the governor of Uttar Pradesh acting as their head.

Governor of Uttar Pradesh 

Articles 153 to 167 in Part VI of the constitution of India deal with the state executive. The state executive consists of the governor, the chief minister, council of ministers and the advocate general of the state. The governor is the chief executive head of the state. The governor also acts as the agent of the center.

Uttar Pradesh Legislative Assembly (Vidhan Sabha) 
The Uttar Pradesh Legislative Assembly is the lower house of the bicameral legislature. It has a total of 403 members excluding one Anglo-Indian member who is nominated by the governor. Till 1967, it had a strength of 431 members, including one nominated Anglo-Indian member. According to the recommendation of the Delimitation Commission, which is appointed after every Census, it was revised to 426. After reorganisation of the state on 9 November 2000, the strength of the Legislative Assembly has become 404 including one nominated member to represent the Anglo-Indian community. The term of the Vidhan Sabha is five years unless dissolved earlier. The election is held on the principle of "one adult one vote".

Terms 
Every five years new election is done. And new assembly is elected by the people of Uttar Pradesh.

Constituencies 
There are total 403 constituencies given below in the table.

Uttar Pradesh Legislative Council (Vidhan Parishad) 
Main Article : Vidhan Parishad

The Uttar Pradesh Vidhan Parishad or the Uttar Pradesh Legislative Council is the upper house of the bicameral legislature of Uttar Pradesh state in northern India. Uttar Pradesh is one of the seven states in India, where the state legislature is bicameral, comprising two houses: the Vidhan Sabha (Legislative Assembly) and the Vidhan Parishad (Legislative Council). The Vidhan Parishad is a permanent House, consisting of 100 members.

History
The Uttar Pradesh Vidhan Parishad came into existence by the Government of India Act of 1935. The governor, Ram Naik, was a part of it. The Legislative Council consisted of 60 members. The term of a member of the council was nine years with one-third of its members retiring after every three years. The Houses enjoyed the right of electing their Presiding Officers known as the president. The first meeting of the legislative council was held on 29 July 1937. Sir Sitaram and Begum Aijaz Rasul were elected the president and the vice-president of the legislative council respectively. Sir Sitaram was in office till 9 March 1949. Chandra Bhal became the next chairman on 10 March 1949.

After the independence and adoption of the constitution on 26 January 1950 Chandra Bhal was re-elected the chairman of the legislative council and continued in office till 5 May 1958. Sri Nizamuddin was elected the deputy chairman of the council on 27 May 1952. He continued in office till 1964.

Nominations and election 
When, under the provisions of the Government of India Act 1935, the legislative council came into existence in the United Provinces, it comprised 60 members. On 26 January 1950, the total membership of the Vidhan Parishad (legislative council) of Uttar Pradesh state was increased from 60 to 72.  With the Constitution (Seventh Amendment) Act 1956, the strength of the council was enhanced to 108. After the reorganisation of Uttar Pradesh state in November 2000 and the creation of Uttarakhand state, this strength has now reduced to 100. The present composition of the Vidhan Parishad is as follows:
 10 members are nominated by the governor of Uttar Pradesh.
 38 members are elected by the Uttar Pradesh Vidhan Sabha members.
 36 members are elected by the Local bodies.
 8 members are elected by the teachers.
 8 members are elected by the graduates.

Term 
Members are now elected or nominated for six years and one-third of them retire every second year. The presiding officers of Vidhan Parishad are now known as chairman and deputy chairman. Mr. Ramesh Yadav is a chairman of this house at a time.

Constituencies and members 
The following are the constituencies of the Uttar Pradesh Vidhan Parishad:

The names of Dr Kamlesh Kumar Pathak, Sanjay Seth, Ranvijay Singh, Abdul Sarfraz Khan and Dr Rajpal Kashyap as recommended by the government were rejected by the governor Ram Naik as they were not nominated on basis or excellence in arts, social service, science etc.

See also

References 

Buildings and structures completed in 1928
1928 establishments in India
Legislative buildings in India
Buildings and structures in Lucknow
Samuel Swinton Jacob buildings
Uttar Pradesh Legislative Assembly
Uttar Pradesh Legislative Council
Uttar Pradesh Legislature
Government buildings in Uttar Pradesh
20th-century architecture in India